The Rattlesnake Wilderness is located in the U.S. state of Montana. Created by an act of Congress in 1980, the wilderness is within Lolo National Forest and is located only 4 miles (6.5 km) north of Missoula, Montana. The wilderness area is a component of the Rattlesnake National Recreation Area. It protects much of the high country of the Rattlesnake Mountains.

U.S. Wilderness Areas largely do not allow motorized or mechanized vehicles, however bicycles are permitted within the Rattlesnake Wilderness on designated routes. Although camping and fishing are allowed with proper permit, no roads or buildings are constructed and there is also no logging or mining, in compliance with the 1964 Wilderness Act. Wilderness areas within National Forests and Bureau of Land Management areas also allow hunting in season.

References

External links
 
 
 

Protected areas of Missoula County, Montana
Wilderness areas of Montana
Forests and Wilderness Areas of Missoula County, Montana
Lolo National Forest
Protected areas established in 1980
1980 establishments in Montana